Yangtze University (Yangtze U) is a provincial public university with campuses in Jingzhou and Wuhan, Hubei, China. 

The university was established by the incorporation of four public colleges: Jianghan Petroleum Institute, Hubei Agricultural College, Jingzhou Normal College, and Hubei Provincial Medical College of Health Workers in 2003.

The university's traditional campus is in Jingzhou, with the new campus in Wuhan.

Yangtze University is known for its petroleum-related teaching programs and research capacities in China, as the former Jianghan Petroleum Institute was one of the major Chinese petroleum institutes. According to the "2022-2023 Best Global Universities Rankings - USNews.com", Yangtze University Rankings as:
1712 in Best Global Universities (tie)
633 in Best Global Universities in Asia (tie)
236 in Best Global Universities in China (tie)
https://www.usnews.com/education/best-global-universities/yangtze-university-529494

Notable faculty and alumni 
Zhang Yongyi, Vice Minister of the Ministry of Petroleum, Deputy General Manager of China National Petroleum Corporation, former director of the former Southwest Petroleum Institute
Shohrat Zakir, Xinjiang Uygur Autonomous Region Party committee secretary, autonomous region people's government party secretary, chairman
Li Fanrong, CNOOC Group members, deputy general manager, limited company CEO and president
Liao Yongyuan, General Manager of China National Petroleum Corporation

References

External links 
http://english.yangtzeu.edu.cn/list.php?fid=60
http://www.yangtzeu.edu.cn 

Universities and colleges in Wuhan
1950 establishments in China
Educational institutions established in 1950